A jute mill is a factory for processing jute. The first jute mill was established in Dundee, Scotland. The world's largest jute mill was the Adamjee Jute Mills at Narayanganj in Bangladesh. It closed all operations during 2002.

Jack London worked in a jute mill before becoming a successful writer.

See also
Textile manufacturing